The 1952 South American Championships in Athletics  were held in the Argentine capital, Buenos Aires, between 3 and 11 May.

Medal summary

Men's events

Women's events

* = after run-off, both athletes ran 25.5 in both races

Medal table

External links
 Men Results – GBR Athletics
 Women Results – GBR Athletics
 Medallists

S
South American Championships in Athletics
 Sports competitions in Buenos Aires
1952 in South American sport
Athletics
Athletics